Alberta Sackey (born November 6, 1972) is a Ghanaian former international footballer who played as a forward. She played for Ghana at the 1999 FIFA Women's World Cup and the 2003 FIFA Women's World Cup. Her goal against Australia in the 2003 World Cup was nominated on FIFA.com for the greatest goal in Women's World Cup history. She was the 2002 African Women's Footballer of the Year.

See also

References

1972 births
Living people
Women's association football forwards
1999 FIFA Women's World Cup players
2003 FIFA Women's World Cup players
Ghanaian women's footballers
Ghana women's international footballers
African Women's Footballer of the Year winners
Ghanaian sportspeople